Defending gold medalist Andy Murray of Great Britain successfully defended his title, defeating Juan Martín del Potro of Argentina in the final, 7–5, 4–6, 6–2, 7–5 to win the gold medal in Men's Singles tennis at the 2016 Summer Olympics. He became the first tennis player ever, male or female, to win two Olympic singles gold medals. Murray and del Potro were only the third and fourth men to win multiple singles medals of any color (following del Potro's bronze in 2012). Murray's gold was Great Britain's fifth in men's singles, the most of any nation. In the bronze medal match, Japan's Kei Nishikori defeated Spain's Rafael Nadal, 6–2, 6–7(1–7), 6–3, earning Japan's first men's singles Olympic medal since 1920.

The tournament was held at the Olympic Tennis Centre in the Barra Olympic Park in Barra da Tijuca in the west zone of Rio de Janeiro, Brazil. The final was played on 14 August 2016. There were 64 players from 34 nations.

World No. 1 ranked Novak Djokovic lost in the first round to del Potro in straight sets. Djokovic was attempting to complete the career Super Slam; his defeat marked his first loss in the opening round of a tournament since 2009. This was the second consecutive Olympic singles match where del Potro defeated Djokovic, following their encounter in the bronze medal match in 2012.

Background

This was the 15th (medal) appearance of the men's singles tennis event. The event has been held at every Summer Olympics where tennis has been on the program: from 1896 to 1924 and then from 1988 to the current program. Demonstration events were held in 1968 and 1984.

The number one seed was Novak Djokovic of Serbia, making his third Olympic appearance after reaching the semifinals in 2008 (bronze medal) and 2012 (fourth place). The defending champion and number two seed was Andy Murray of Great Britain. Spain's Rafael Nadal, the 2008 gold medalist who was unable to compete in 2012 due to injury, was the third seed. Sidelined with injury this time was Roger Federer of Switzerland (who, like Djokovic, needed only an Olympic gold for a career Golden Slam). 2012 bronze medalist Argentinian Juan Martín del Potro returned, as did quarterfinalists Kei Nishikori of Japan (the fourth seed) and Jo-Wilfried Tsonga of France (fifth seed).

Barbados, Bosnia and Herzegovina, the Dominican Republic, Georgia, Lithuania, and Moldova each made their debut in the event. France made its 14th appearance, most among all nations, having missed only the 1904 event.

Qualification

Qualification for the men's singles was primarily through the ATP ranking list of 11 June 2016. An additional restriction was that players had to have been part of a nominated team for three Davis Cup events between 2013 and 2016 (with some exceptions). Nations had been limited to four players in the event since the 2000 Games. There were 64 quota places available for men's singles. The first 56 were assigned through the world ranking. There were two Tripartite Commission invitation places and 6 final qualification places allocated by the ITF based on continental and national representation along with world rankings.

Competition format

The competition was a single-elimination tournament with a bronze medal match. Matches were in best-of-3 sets, except for the final which was in best-of-5 sets. A tiebreak would be played in all sets reaching 6–6 (previously, no tiebreak would be used in the third set of a non-final match or the fifth set of the final).

Schedule

Seeds 

Seeds were based on ATP rankings as of 1 August 2016.

  (first round)
  (champion, gold medalist)
  (semifinals, fourth place)
  (semifinals, bronze medalist)
  (second round)
  (quarterfinals)
  (second round)
  (third round)
  (third round)
  (quarterfinals)
  (second round)
  (quarterfinals)
  (second round, withdrew due to foot injury)
  (first round)
  (third round)
  (second round)

Draw 
Players placement onto the table is such that no two players from the same country start within the same quarter section of the table, hence making it impossible for them to meet until the semifinals. This is enabled by the qualification rule that states that no country can bring more than four players for each of the singles tournament. The countries bringing the maximum of four players are Argentina, Australia, France, Italy, Spain and United States.

 TRI = Tripartite Invitation
 IP = ITF place

Finals

Top half

Section 1

Section 2

Bottom half

Section 3

Section 4

Participating nations

References

External links
 Men's Singles Drawsheet
 Olympic Tennis Event
 Entry List

Men's Singles
2016 ATP World Tour
Men's events at the 2016 Summer Olympics